Sakis, or saki monkeys, are any of several New World monkeys of the genus Pithecia. They are closely related to the bearded sakis of genus Chiropotes.

Range
Sakis' range includes northern and central South America, extending from the south of Colombia, over Peru, in northern Bolivia, and into the central part of Brazil.

Body functionality
Sakis are small-sized monkeys with long, bushy tails. Their furry, rough skin is black, grey or reddish-brown in color depending upon the species. The faces of some species are naked, but their head is hooded with fur. Their bodies are adapted to life in the trees, with strong hind legs allowing them to make far jumps. Sakis reach a length of 30 to 50 cm, with a tail just as long, and weigh up to 2 kg.

Habitat and habit
Sakis are diurnal animals. They live in the trees of the rain forests and only occasionally go onto the land. They mostly move on all fours, sometimes running in an upright position on the hind legs over the branches, and sometimes jumping long distances. For sleeping they roll themselves cat-like in the branches. They are generally very shy, cautious animals. Sakis allow adult offspring and non-related immigrants into their groups unlike titi or owl monkeys. Saki monkeys have been commonly considered to be socially monogamous, but generally only sakis who are pair-living exhibit social monogamy. Females primarily carry infants and male-infant interactions are rare.

Diet
Sakis are frugivores. Their diet consists of over 90% fruit and is supplemented by a small proportion of leaves, flowers, and insects. Sakis, as well as uakaris, engage in a specialized form of frugivory in which they focus specifically on unripe fruits and seeds.

Procreation
Mating is non-seasonal, and can happen any time during the year. After approximately 150- to 180-day gestation, females bear single young. The young are weaned after 4 months, and are fully mature in 3 years. Their life expectancy is up to 30 years.

Classification 
 Genus Pithecia
 Equatorial saki, Pithecia aequatorialis
 White-footed saki or buffy saki, Pithecia albicans
 Cazuza's saki, Pithecia cazuzai
 Golden-faced saki, Pithecia chrysocephala
 Hairy saki, Pithecia hirsuta
 Burnished saki, Pithecia inusta
 Rio Tapajós saki or Gray's bald-faced saki, Pithecia irrorata
 Isabel's saki, Pithecia isabela
 Monk saki, Pithecia monachus
 Miller's saki, Pithecia milleri
 Mittermeier's Tapajós saki, Pithecia mittermeieri (disputed)
 Napo saki, Pithecia napensis
Pissinatti’s saki, Pithecia pissinattii (disputed)
 White-faced saki, Pithecia pithecia
 Rylands' bald-faced saki, Pithecia rylandsi (disputed)
 Vanzolini's bald-faced saki, Pithecia vanzolinii

References

External links

 Primate Info Net Pithecia Factsheets

 
Primates of South America
Mammals described in 1804